Revolutionary Communist Party of Turkey-Socialist Unity (in Turkish: Türkiye Devrimci Komünist Partisi-Sosyalist Birlik) was a clandestine Marxist-Leninist political party in Turkey. It was founded in 1987, following a split from the Revolutionary Communist Party of Turkey (TDKP). It was dissolved in 1990.

See also
List of illegal political parties in Turkey
Communist Party of Turkey (disambiguation), for other groups using similar names

Defunct communist parties in Turkey
Political parties established in 1987
Banned political parties in Turkey
Political parties disestablished in 1990
Banned communist parties